The women's 1500 metres in speed skating at the 1980 Winter Olympics took place on February 14, at the James B. Sheffield Olympic Skating Rink.

Records
Prior to this competition, the existing world and Olympic records were as follows:

The following new Olympic and world records were set during this competition.

Results

References

Women's speed skating at the 1980 Winter Olympics
Olymp
Skat